Chupayevo (Supay) is a rural locality (a selo) in Akbarisovsky Selsoviet, Sharansky District, Bashkortostan, Russia. The population was 176 as of 2010. There are 5 street.

Geography 
Chupayevo is located 9 km southeast of Sharan (the district's administrative centre) by road. Meshcherevo is the nearest rural locality.

References 

Rural localities in Sharansky District